Ludovic Martin (born 25 October 1983) is a Swiss trampoline gymnast. He represented Switzerland at the 2004 Summer Olympics in Athens, Greece in the men's trampoline event. He finished in 9th place in the qualification round.

In 2005 he won the silver medal in the men's synchro event at the 2005 Trampoline World Championships in Eindhoven, Netherlands. At the 2007 Trampoline World Championships in Quebec, Canada he won the bronze medal in this event.

He worked in accounting for some time and in September 2008 he joined Cirque du Soleil.

References

External links 
 

Living people
1983 births
Place of birth missing (living people)
Swiss male trampolinists
Olympic gymnasts of Switzerland
Gymnasts at the 2004 Summer Olympics
Medalists at the Trampoline Gymnastics World Championships
Cirque du Soleil performers